Vítor Bruno Ramos Gonçalves (born 13 January 1990), known as Vítor Bruno, is a Portuguese professional footballer who played for Académico de Viseu F.C. mainly as a left back.

Club career
Born in Vila do Conde, Vítor Bruno began his youth career at F.C. Famalicão before joining FC Porto. He was also loaned to CD Candal, where he later made his senior debut in the fourth division in the 2009–10 season.

After a year in the third tier with G.D. Ribeirão, Vítor Bruno signed for F.C. Penafiel of the Segunda Liga in 2011. He was part of their squad that won promotion to the Primeira Liga in 2013–14, and scored once the following campaign, equalising in a 3–2 away loss against Sporting CP on 9 March 2015.

On 31 May 2015, after Penafiel were relegated in last place, Vítor Bruno and teammate Dani Coelho signed three-year contracts at CFR Cluj in Romania's Liga I. Joined by compatriots including manager Toni Conceição, he won the Cupa României in his only season with a penalty shootout victory over FC Dinamo București on 17 May 2016.

Vítor Bruno returned to his country's top flight in June 2016, agreeing to a three-year deal at C.D. Feirense. The following off-season, however, he moved to Boavista F.C. on a two-year contract, but returned to his former club halfway through.

In April 2019, after already-relegated Feirense lost 4–1 at home to eventual champions S.L. Benfica, Vítor Bruno wrote a lengthy publication on Facebook lamenting the quality of his team's play. He became a free agent subsequently, and signed a one-year deal with second-division Leixões S.C. that August.

Honours
CFR Cluj
Cupa României: 2015–16

References

External links

1990 births
Living people
People from Vila do Conde
Portuguese footballers
Association football defenders
Primeira Liga players
Liga Portugal 2 players
Segunda Divisão players
Padroense F.C. players
CD Candal players
G.D. Ribeirão players
F.C. Penafiel players
C.D. Feirense players
Boavista F.C. players
Leixões S.C. players
U.D. Vilafranquense players
Académico de Viseu F.C. players
Liga I players
CFR Cluj players
Portugal youth international footballers
Portuguese expatriate footballers
Expatriate footballers in Romania
Portuguese expatriate sportspeople in Romania
Sportspeople from Porto District